Mendel Glacier is on the north side of Mount Mendel in the Sierra Nevada, California. The name is commonly used; however, the name is not recognized by the United States Geological Survey in the Geographic Names Information System.

The middle and lower portions of the glacier are covered with rock debris.

A US Army plane crashed above or into the glacier in 1942 with four airmen on board during a navigation training mission.

See also
List of glaciers in the United States

References

Glaciers of California
Glaciers of Fresno County, California